The North Dakota State Bison women's basketball team is part of the athletic program at North Dakota State University in Fargo, North Dakota, United States. They are members of the NCAA Division I and the Summit League. The Bison head coach position is currently held by Jory Collins in his 4th season.

NCAA Division II Championships

NCAA Division II runner-up teams:
1986
1992
2000

Postseason

WNIT
The Bison have made one appearance in the Women's National Invitation Tournament (WNIT).

NCAA Division II tournament results
The Bison made eighteen appearances in the NCAA Division II women's basketball tournament. They had a combined record of 47–13.

AIAW College Division/Division II
The Bison made two appearances in the AIAW National Division II basketball tournament, with a combined record of 2–2–1.

Arenas
Bentson Bunker Fieldhouse 1966–1970
Bison Sports Arena 1970–2016
Scheels Center 2016–present

Head coaches

References

External links